Veneta Krasimirova Krasteva  (born 23 December 1991) is a Bulgarian model and beauty pageant titleholder who was crowned Miss Universe Bulgaria 2013 and Miss World Bulgaria 2015 and the president of the Miss World Bulgaria Organization. She represented Bulgaria at Miss Universe 2013 and Miss World 2015 and had the distinction of being the first and only Bulgarian to represent Bulgaria at two of the largest and oldest international pageants in the world Miss World and Miss Universe. Veneta is currently the president of the Miss World, Mr. World and Miss Universe Bulgaria Organization.

Early life
Veneta was born in Sofia, Bulgaria, she attended 127th High School "Ivan N. Denkoglu" and later started studied Tourism in the, Sofia University.

Pageantry

Miss Universe Bulgaria 2013
Veneta bested other 29 contestants to be crowned Miss Bulgaria Universe 2013 at the conclusion of the pageant held on 22 September 2013 at the Sofia Event Center.

Miss Universe 2013
Veneta represented Bulgaria at the 62nd annual Miss Universe 2013 at the Crocus City Hall, Krasnogorsk, a suburb of Moscow, Russia.

Miss World Bulgaria 2015
Veneta was appointed as Miss World Bulgaria and competed at Miss World 2015 pageant.

Miss World 2015
Veneta represented Bulgaria at the 65th edition of the Miss World pageant held on 19 December 2015 at the Crown of Beauty Theatre in Sanya, China PR.

Personal life
Since 2016, she became the Official Executive Director of the leading fashion and model agency Bok Star Models based in Sofia  licensee of Miss World and Mister World, Miss Universe and Miss Grand International for Bulgaria.
 Veneta gave birth to her first child - a son named Maximilian Oustabassidis in Haselt, Belgia on 16 April 2018.

Veneta serves as an ambassador for the Beauty with a Purpose Program.

References

Bulgarian beauty pageant winners
Bulgarian female models
1991 births
Living people
Miss Universe 2013 contestants
Miss World 2015 delegates